The Democratic Party (PD) was a Spanish political party created in 1879 by former Emilio Castelar as a split from the Federal Democratic Republican Party to contest the Spanish general election held in the same year. In 1884 it was renamed as the Possibilist Democratic Party (PDP).

In 1893 most of it merged into the Liberal Party.

See also
Liberalism and radicalism in Spain

References

Defunct political parties in Spain
Defunct liberal political parties
Political parties established in 1879
Political parties disestablished in 1893
Radical parties
Republican parties in Spain
1879 establishments in Spain
1893 disestablishments in Spain